Štichovice is a municipality and village in Plzeň-North District in the Plzeň Region of the Czech Republic. It has about 100 inhabitants.

Administrative parts
The village of Křečov is an administrative part of Štichovice.

References

Villages in Plzeň-North District